The 2014 Asian Games, officially known as the XVII Asiad, is the largest sporting event in Asia governed by Olympic Council of Asia (OCA). It was held at Incheon, South Korea between September 19 – October 4, 2014, with 439 events in 36 sports and disciplines set to feature in the Games.

Medal table

Changes in medal standings

On 30 September 2014, the Olympic Council of Asia (OCA) announced that Malaysian Tai Cheau Xuen had been stripped of her gold medal in the women's nanquan event after she tested positive for sibutramine. As a result, Indonesian Juwita Niza Wasni was awarded the gold, China's Wei Hong was awarded the silver and Indonesia's Ivana Ardelia Irmanto awarded the bronze.

On 3 October 2014, Chinese athlete Zhang Wenxiu had been stripped of her gold medal in the women's hammer throw after she tested positive for the prohibited substance zeranol, However, on 6 May 2015 the Court of Arbitration for Sport reinstated her gold medal on her appeal after ruling that the zeranol came from contaminated food.

On 27 May 2015, South Korean Park Tae-hwan had been stripped of his six medals after he tested positive for nebido before the games. Park participated in 6 events in the swimming competition, Men’s 4x 100 M Medley relay Final (3rd place); Men’s 100m Freestyle Final (2nd place); Men’s 4 x 100m Freestyle Relay Final (3rd place); Men’s x 200m Freestyle Relay Final (3rd place); Men’s 200m Freestyle Final (3rd place), Men’s 400m Freestyle Final (3rd place).

References

External links
Official medal table

Medal table
2014